Edgar "Lefty" Baker was a baseball pitcher in the Negro leagues. He played with the Memphis Red Sox in 1945.

References

External links
  and Seamheads

Memphis Red Sox players
Year of birth missing
Year of death missing
Baseball pitchers